Eccritotarsus is a genus of Miridae tribe Eccritotarsini, found in the Americas.

Partial species list
Eccritotarsus catarinensis Carvalho
Eccritotarsus pilosus Carvalho and Gomes, 1971
Eccritotarsus pallidirostris Stal
Eccritotarsus incurvus Distant

References

Miridae genera
Hemiptera of South America
Eccritotarsini